Marhu Teferi (or Teferi Marhu, ; born August 17, 1992) is an Ethiopian-born Israeli marathon and half marathon runner, silver medallist in marathon at the 2022 European Athletics Championships in Munich. He represented Israel at the 2016 Summer Olympics in the Marathon. He also represented Israel at the 2020 Summer Olympics. He has set Israeli records in both the marathon and half marathon.

Biography
Marhu Teferi was born in Ethiopia to a family of Ethiopian-Jewish background, and immigrated to Israel at the age of 14 along with most of his family.

His wife Selamawit Dagnachew is an Ethiopian-born and an Israeli citizen on account of their marriage, is a mid- and long-distance runner who has also qualified to compete for Israel at the 2020 Summer Olympics.

Running career
Teferi is an Israeli half marathon champion, having won the title in December 2015, ahead of Berihun We've and Israeli Olympian Ageze Guadie.

Due to his 2:18.19 finish in the Rotterdam Marathon in April 2016, in which he came in 23rd, he qualified for the 2016 Olympics.

He competed for Israel at the 2016 Summer Olympics in the marathon, and finished 74th out of 155 runners, with a time of 2:21:06.

In January 2018, Teferi finished in second place (2:18.35) at the Tiberias Marathon. In August 2018, he ran a 2:13:00 and broke the Israeli marathon record (set in 2003 by Ayele Seteng), while coming in seventh in the 2018 European Athletics Championships in Berlin, Germany.

In February 2019 he ran the Seville Marathon in 2:10:11 in Seville, Spain. In April 2019 Teferi set a new Israeli half-marathon record at 1:02:05, winning a race in Berlin.

On 27 October 2019, Teferi ran the Frankfurt Marathon in 2:08:09 in Frankfurt, Germany, setting a new Israeli record and finishing in 6th place.

Teferi represented Israel at the 2020 Olympics, where he finished 13th, the best ever finish for an Israeli marathoner at the Olympics.

In August 2022, at the European Championships in  Munich, Teferi won the silver medal for Israel in the individual marathon competition.

Personal bests
 3000 metres – 8:04.31 (Tel Aviv 2020)
 5000 metres – 13:40.37 (Heusden-Zolder 2019)
 10,000 metres – 28:34.27 (Tel Aviv 2020)
Road
 5 kilometres – 13:52 (Tel Aviv 2021)
 10 kilometres – 28:18 (Tel Aviv 2020) 
 Half marathon – 1:00:52 (Tallinn 2019) 
 Marathon – 2:06:43 (Fukuoka 2022)

See also
List of Israeli records in athletics
List of Jews in sports
Sports in Israel

References

External links
 

Athletes (track and field) at the 2016 Summer Olympics
Ethiopian Jews
Ethiopian emigrants to Israel
Citizens of Israel through Law of Return
Israeli male marathon runners
Israeli Jews
Israeli male long-distance runners
Living people
Olympic athletes of Israel
Israeli people of Ethiopian-Jewish descent
Sportspeople of Ethiopian descent
1992 births
Athletes (track and field) at the 2020 Summer Olympics
European Athletics Championships medalists